Coketown is an unincorporated community on the Ohio River in Brooke County, West Virginia, United States. Coketown lies north of Follansbee along West Virginia State Route 2.

References

Unincorporated communities in Brooke County, West Virginia
Unincorporated communities in West Virginia